László Vécsey (born 1 September 1958) is a Hungarian politician, mayor of Szada from 1998 to 2014 and member of the National Assembly (MP) for Gödöllő (Pest County Constituency IV then VI) since 2010.

He was a member of the Committee on Employment and Labour from 2010 to 2014, and member then vice-chairman of the Legislative Committee since 2014.

He was born into the baronial branch of old noble Vécsey family.

References

1958 births
Living people
Hungarian engineers
Laszlo
Mayors of places in Hungary
Hungarian Democratic Forum politicians
Fidesz politicians
Members of the National Assembly of Hungary (2010–2014)
Members of the National Assembly of Hungary (2014–2018)
Members of the National Assembly of Hungary (2018–2022)
Members of the National Assembly of Hungary (2022–2026)
People from Gödöllő